Josep Cunill Clapés (born 9 July 2001) is a Spanish field hockey player who plays as a midfielder for División de Honor club Atlètic Terrassa and the Spain national team.

Personal life
Pepe Cunill has an older brother, Pau, who also plays field hockey for Spain.

Club career
In the Spanish División de Honor, Cunill plays for Atlètic Terrassa.

International career

Under–21
Cunill made his debut for the Spain under-21 team in 2021, at the FIH Junior World Cup in Bhubaneswar.

Los Redsticks
In 2020, Cunill was named in Los Redsticks for the first time. He represented the team in season two of the FIH Pro League. The following year he was named in the Spanish squad again for season three of the Pro League. He made his World Cup debut at the 2023 Men's FIH Hockey World Cup.

Honours
Atlètic Terrassa
 Divisón de Honor: 2021–22
 Copa del Rey: 2021–22

References

External links
 
 

2001 births
Living people
Male field hockey midfielders
Spanish male field hockey players
2023 Men's FIH Hockey World Cup players
División de Honor de Hockey Hierba players
Atlètic Terrassa players
Place of birth missing (living people)